Ruth Ngozika Agbakoba is a British digital health consultant and author who currently works as an advisor in health data research. She has worked to develop Black in Data and also started a podcast surrounding equity in academia.

Education 
Agbakoba earned an undergraduate bachelor of science degree in biomedical informatics from St. George’s Medical School at the University of London. She then achieved a master's degree in health informatics from City University and then a doctorate degree in digital health informatics at the University of Glasgow.

Career and research 
Agbakoba first worked as an information analyst at the UK’s National Health Service. She then went on to work as an honorary research associate at the UCL Institute of Health Informatics. She is a co-founder of Black in Data, an organization that advocates for Black people in data science. Agbakoba has also worked to develop Scotland’s AI supported electronic health record, which works by finding factors affecting the innovations of patient care.

Awards 
Ruth Agbakoba received the first prize at the World Congress on Medical IT.

Notable works 
"Factors affecting the implementation of a National Digital Health & Wellbeing Service at scale." This was Agbakoba's doctoral thesis on the global challenges that healthcare faces in the 21st century.

References 

Living people
Year of birth missing (living people)
Alumni of St George's, University of London
Alumni of the University of Glasgow
British people in health professions
British non-fiction writers